Columbia Center is a historic neighborhood of the city of Pataskala in Licking County, Ohio, United States.

History
Columbia Center was platted around 1850 when the railroad was extended to that point. A post office was established at Columbia Center in 1851, and remained in operation until 1907.

References

Neighborhoods in Ohio
Geography of Licking County, Ohio
1850 establishments in Ohio
Populated places established in 1850